His Lordship is a 1936 British drama film directed by Herbert Mason and starring George Arliss, Romilly Lunge and Rene Ray.  It was released with the alternative title Man of Affairs in the United States.

Plot
Its plot involves Arliss as a British Foreign secretary swapping identities with his black sheep twin brother (also Arliss), and the rescuing of Britain from war with an Arab nation.

Production

The film was based on the 1931 play The Nelson Touch by Neil Grant. It was made the Lime Grove Studios in London, with sets designed by art director Alfred Junge.

Cast
 George Arliss as Richard Fraser / Lord Duncaster
 Romilly Lunge as Bill Howard
 Rene Ray as Vera
 Allan Jeayes as Barak
 Jessie Winter as Lady Duncaster
 John Ford as Ibrahim
 Lawrence Anderson as Nahil
 Bernard Merefield as Phillpotts
 John Turnbull as Stevenson
 Basil Gill as Abdullah

Critical reception
TV Guide wrote "The best thing about the film is some nice split-screen work, which has detective Arliss shaking the hand of politician Arliss."

Cinema critic and historian, Tony Sloman for Radio Times said that "[the] film's stage derivation seeps through the whole enterprise, and the combination of Boys' Own heroics and the politics of war is as hard to take today as it probably was then. But Arliss was undeniably a star, and those who only know his historical roles may enjoy seeing him in a contemporary part."

References

Bibliography
 Low, Rachael. Filmmaking in 1930s Britain. George Allen & Unwin, 1985.
 Wood, Linda. British Films, 1927-1939. British Film Institute, 1986.

External links

 His Lordship at BFI
 His Lordship at AllMovie

1936 films
1936 comedy-drama films
British comedy-drama films
1930s English-language films
Films directed by Herbert Mason
British films based on plays
Films shot at Lime Grove Studios
British black-and-white films
Films set in the Middle East
Films set in London
Gainsborough Pictures films
Films about twin brothers
1937 comedy films
1937 drama films
1937 films
1930s British films